Martin Clifford Doherty (born 24 December 1982) is a Scottish musician, singer and record producer. He is a member of Glasgow-based pop band Chvrches, with whom he has recorded four studio albums. Prior to forming Chvrches, Doherty was a touring member of the indie rock bands The Twilight Sad and Aereogramme.

Doherty plays keyboards, sampler, guitar and performs main vocals and backing vocals. He also contributes to Chvrches' songwriting and production.

Doherty’s father is also a Catholic Deacon and Religious Education teacher. He supports Celtic.

Biography
Prior to the formation of Chvrches, Doherty was a touring member of The Twilight Sad. He was also the frontman of the rock band Julia Thirteen, founded in 1999 and disbanded in 2006. He met and befriended future Chvrches bandmate Iain Cook in 2004 while attending the University of Strathclyde. In 2006, Cook co-recorded Julia Thirteen's debut EP before Doherty joined Cook's own band Aereogramme in 2007.

Both on Chvrches' debut album The Bones of What You Believe and in concert, Doherty performs lead vocals for the songs "Under the Tide" and "You Caught the Light", the latter on which he also plays bass guitar. Some early performances of the song "We Sink" featured Doherty as the lead vocalist, though lead singer Lauren Mayberry later assumed that role full-time. Chvrches' second album Every Open Eye has Doherty on lead vocals for the songs "High Enough to Carry You Over" and "Follow You", the latter of which is a bonus track included on deluxe versions of the album. Though initially excluded from set lists early in the Every Open Eye tour, "High Enough to Carry You Over" made its live debut on 13 March 2016 at the Riviera Theatre in Chicago, Illinois.

Discography
With Chvrches

 The Bones of What You Believe (2013)
 Every Open Eye (2015)
 Love Is Dead (2018)
 Screen Violence (2021)

With The Twilight Sad
 Forget the Night Ahead (2009)

With Aereogramme
 My Heart Has a Wish That You Would Not Go (2007)

With Julia Thirteen
 With Tired Hearts EP (2006)

References

External links
 
 

1982 births
Living people
Scottish keyboardists
Scottish electronic musicians
Scottish record producers
Scottish pop musicians
Scottish rock guitarists
Scottish male guitarists
Post-rock musicians
21st-century Scottish male singers
People from Clydebank
21st-century British guitarists